Phoolan Prasad (born 1 January 1944) is an Indian mathematician who specialised in Partial differential equations, fluid mechanics. He was awarded in 1983 the Shanti Swarup Bhatnagar Prize for Science and Technology, the highest science award in India,  in the mathematical sciences category.  He is Fellow of all Indian Science Academies: The National Academy of Sciences, India (NASI), Indian Academy of Sciences (IAS) and Indian National Science Academy (INSA).

Early life and education
Prasad studied in Nalhati HP High School, Krishnath College Berhampore, received his  B.Sc. from the Presidency College, Calcutta University and M.Sc. from Rajabazar Science College campus of Calcutta University followed by a Ph.D. from Indian Institute of Science (IISc), Bangalore in  1968.

Career
Prasad started his career as a lecturer in the Department of Applied Mathematics in 1967 at Indian Institute of Science, thereafter he became a Professor in 1977. Meanwhile, he also remained a Postdoctoral Fellow at Leeds University (1970–72) and Alexander von Humboldt Fellow (1980-81). He was at the St John's College, Cambridge with privileges of a Fellow of the College.

Prasad has done some significant work in the area on non-linear hyperbolic equations. He succeeded in assessing the basic properties of the equations of various physical phenomena, generalized these mathematical properties and then used his theory to explain new results in the field of non-linear waves. He gave a proof of the existence of a new type of wave on the interface of a clear liquid and a mixture in a sedimentation process.

He continues to be a faculty member at the Department of Mathematics, Indian Institute of Science.

Books
  Wiley Eastern Ltd., 1984, International Edition by John Wiley Sons, New York, 1984 available at http://www.math.iisc.ernet.in/~prasad/prasad/book/PP-RR_PDE_book_1984.pdf
 
 
 
 
 Phoolan Prasad (2018) Propagation of Multi-Dimensional Nonlinear Waves and Kinematical Conservation Laws, Springer, Springer Nature Singapore, DOI 10.1007/s12044-016-0275-6.

Biography, Education and Research
Biographical sketch
Struggle and Success in Education of a Student
Joy and Satisfaction in My Research

References

External links
Prof.Phoolan Prasad, webpage Indian Institute of Science website

1944 births
Living people
20th-century Indian mathematicians
Scholars from Uttar Pradesh
Fellows of the Indian National Science Academy
Academic staff of the Indian Institute of Science
Scientists from Uttar Pradesh
Recipients of the Shanti Swarup Bhatnagar Award in Mathematical Science